John Barry (1935 – 1 June 1979) was a British film production designer, known for his work on Star Wars, for which he received the Academy Award for Best Art Direction.

Career
Born in London, Barry worked as an architect with experience in stage design. He entered the film business as a draughtsman on the epic Elizabeth Taylor film Cleopatra in 1963. He went on to assist art director Elliot Scott on the 1960s spy television series Danger Man, which starred Patrick McGoohan. His first project as art director was on the 1968 film Decline and Fall... of a Birdwatcher.

Barry then became production designer on the Clint Eastwood action film Kelly's Heroes in 1970. Barry was offered the job of designer by Stanley Kubrick for his never-completed film Napoleon, working on the project for a week. Kubrick hired him again as production designer on A Clockwork Orange in 1971. He was production designer on the 1973 science fiction film Phase IV.

He worked on the fantasy musical The Little Prince in 1974. Following a recommendation from Scott, George Lucas travelled to Mexico where Barry was working on Lucky Lady and hired him as production designer for Star Wars. Barry thought the allotted time of seven months to design and build the film's sets was just enough and he took the job.

He later worked on Alexander Salkind's Superman and Superman II. Following these box office hits Barry was given the chance to direct his own project, the science fiction film Saturn 3. During filming, Barry fell out with the movie's star Kirk Douglas and was replaced by Stanley Donen.

He was soon hired by George Lucas as a second unit director on The Empire Strikes Back. On 31 May 1979, two weeks into filming, he collapsed on-set and was hospitalized with a 104-degree temperature. He died at 2 A.M. on 1 June from meningitis. His memorial was held on 11 June at St Paul's Church, Grove Park, Hounslow, London; Barry was cremated that day.

References
Footnotes

Bibliography

External links

Best Art Direction Academy Award winners
British production designers
1935 births
1979 deaths
Deaths from meningitis
Neurological disease deaths in England
Infectious disease deaths in England
British film designers
Businesspeople from London
Artists from London
20th-century English businesspeople